Tein may refer to:

People
 Amat Tein (14–15th century), minister in the Hanthawaddy Kingdom of present-day Myanmar
 Min Tein, Burmese diplomat
 Tanel Tein (born 1978), Estonian basketball player

Other uses
 Tein (company), Japanese company

See also 
 Thein
 Teign, a river in England
 Teind, a tithe
 Tiyin, a unit of currency
 Tain (disambiguation)
 Tien (disambiguation)